Patrizio Masini (born 27 January 2001) is an Italian professional footballer who plays as a midfielder for  club Novara, on loan from Genoa.

Club career
Born in La Spezia, Masini started his career on Genoa youth system. He was loaned to Serie C club Sambenedettese for the 2020–21 season, and made his professional debut on 27 September 2020 against Carpi.

On 29 January 2021 was loaned to Lecco for the rest of the season. He renewed his loan for the next season.

After appearing two times on Genoa's bench early in the 2022–23 season, on 1 September 2022 Masini was loaned by Novara.

References

External links
 
 

2001 births
People from La Spezia
Sportspeople from the Province of La Spezia
Footballers from Liguria
Living people
Italian footballers
Association football midfielders
Serie C players
Genoa C.F.C. players
A.S. Sambenedettese players
Calcio Lecco 1912 players
Novara F.C. players